Baghi Sipahi (Rebel Soldier) is a 1936 Hindi/Urdu film directed by A. R. Kardar. It was an adaptation of Cardinal Richelieu (1935) directed by Rowland V. Lee, a Twentieth Century Pictures production, which was a big success at the box-office. Baghi Sipahi, a costume action drama, was produced by the East India Film Company.

Gul Hamid played the lead, and it  was cited as an "important film" for him. Patience Cooper, Bimla Kumari, Mazhar Khan and Lalita also played significant  roles along with Gul Hamid.

Cast
 Gul Hamid
 Bimla Kumari
 Mazhar Khan
 Lalita Pawar
 Indubala
 Anees
 Azurie
 Mohammed Ishaq

Reception
Baghi Sipahi was a big commercial success, which "won him (Kardar) a wide audience following". However, Kardar was also criticised for "plagiarising", but his handling of the story and theme earned him critical acclaim. The success of the film established East India Company on a large scale across the "Indian film map".

Soundtrack
The music director was K. C. Dey, and the lyricist was Akbar Khan Peshawri.

Songlist

References

External links
 
 Bimla Kumari in Bhagi Sipahi by Rashid Ashraf https://www.flickr.com/photos/rashid_ashraf/16593601277/in/photostream/

1936 films
1930s Hindi-language films
Films directed by A. R. Kardar
Indian black-and-white films